Schillingstedt is a village and a former municipality in the Sömmerda district of Thuringia, Germany. Since July 2018, it is part of the town Sömmerda.

References

Former municipalities in Thuringia
Sömmerda (district)